Clement Nye Swift (1846 – March 29, 1918) was an American artist associated with the Pont-Aven School and known for his paintings of nautical themes and of life in Brittany and Massachusetts.

Biography 

Swift was born in 1846 in Acushnet, Massachusetts to Rhodolphus Nye Swift and Sylvia Hathaway. As a child, he attended the Friends Academy in Dartmouth, Massachusetts. His early interest was in painting animals, and he moved to France to study painting at the École des Beaux-Arts in Paris. He also studied with the artists Adolphe Yvon and Henri Harpignies.

After the outbreak of the Franco-Prussian War in 1870, he moved to Brittany. He settled in the coastal town of Pont-Aven, where he joined the artistic community known the Pont-Aven School. He lived there for ten years, and during this time he produced the majority of his paintings. Between 1872 and 1880, he exhibited his work at the Paris Salon.

In 1881, Swift returned to Acushnet, Massachusetts, where he took up writing, producing a series of stories and poems. He married his cousin Annie Amelia Swift on October 15, 1895. He died March 29, 1918 and is buried in Acushnet Cemetery.

References

External links 
 Clement Nye Swift papers at the New Bedford Whaling Museum

1846 births
1918 deaths
19th-century American painters
20th-century American painters
American male painters
American marine artists
Pont-Aven painters
People from Acushnet, Massachusetts
19th-century American male artists
20th-century American male artists